Oliver Under the Moon is Pistolita's first studio album, released on February 7, 2006.

Track listing
"Cupid" – 3:06
"Voicebox" – 2:54
"Béni Accident" – 3:21
"Age" – 4:37
"Fadawhite" – 3:30
"Papercut" – 3:50
"China Dolls" – 1:53
"Killjoy" – 3:30
"Oliver Under the Moon" – 2:58
"Metronome" – 3:09
"Pity Refrain" – 4:05
"Panic" - 7:25

2006 albums